Viktorya Aviyente is a Turkish computational chemist. Aviyente is a professor emeritus at Boğaziçi University. Her research interests include computational chemistry and molecular modelling. Aviyente completed a B.S. (1973), M.S. (1977), and Ph.D. (1983) in chemistry at Boğaziçi University.

References

External links 

 

Turkish women chemists
Turkish chemists
20th-century women scientists
21st-century women scientists
Boğaziçi University alumni
Academic staff of Boğaziçi University
Computational chemists
Living people
Year of birth missing (living people)
Place of birth missing (living people)